Anniella geronimensis, also known as the Baja California legless lizard, is a species of legless lizard found in Mexico.

References

Anniella
Reptiles described in 1940
Lizards of North America
Fauna of Mexico